Kayadibi is a village in the Kozluk District, Batman Province, Turkey. Its population is 146 (2021).

The hamlets of Atlı and Binektaşı are attached to the village.

References

Villages in Kozluk District

Kurdish settlements in Batman Province